The Newark Academy (formerly The Grove School) is a mixed secondary school in Balderton, Nottinghamshire, England.

Admissions
The Newark Academy offers GCSEs, BTECs and Cambridge Nationals as programmes of study for pupils.

History

Former grammar school
Newark had a former girls' grammar school, the Lilley and Stone Girls' School, similar to Retford's Retford High School for Girls. Barbara Dibb was the headmistress of this school from 1947 to 1971. The school was also known as the Lilley & Stone Foundation Newark High School for Girls.

Comprehensive
It became the Grove School in 1976 when Newark went comprehensive, from the Grove Secondary Modern School.

The former Lilley and Stone School is a listed building. For the first three years at secondary school, attendance was at the Sconce Hills High School; Paul Upex, a school caretaker, murdered a 13-year-old girl at the school, being jailed in November 1988. The last two years before 16 were at the Lilley and Stone School. These two schools merged in 1997 to become the Newark High School. This school was in special measures between 1999 and 2001. Its small sixth form closed in 2003. By 2007, pupil numbers were expected to fall below 300, which was less than half the capacity of the school. This site closed as a school in 2008, becoming the academy's sixth form. The whole site closed in 2016.

The town's boys' grammar school became the Magnus Church of England School, still retaining most of its former name. Retford went comprehensive in 1979, and like Newark, has suffered from a haemorrhaging of admissions to schools outside of the town itself.

Academy chain
Previously a community school administered by Nottinghamshire County Council, The Grove School converted to academy status on 1 November 2012 and was renamed The Newark Academy. From Autumn 2016 the school will become part of the Torch Academy Gateway Trust. The school continues to coordinate with Nottinghamshire County Council for admissions.

New building
The school moved into a new building in January 2016 situated on part of the playing field, with the area occupied by the previous building being demolished and re-landscaped.

Notable former pupils
 Caroline Mockford, Legal Secretary to Archbishop of York since 2015
 Toby Kebbell, actor

Lilley and Stone School
 Jenny Saville, artist

Lilley and Stone High School for Girls
 Julia Allison, General Secretary from 1994 to 1997 of the Royal College of Midwives (1951–58)
 Annette Cooper, Archdeacon of Colchester since 2004
 Enid Essame, Headmistress from 1943 to 1971 of Queenswood School, and President from 1962 to 1964 of the Association of Headmistresses of Boarding Schools (now the Girls' Schools Association)
 Sadie Hartley (nee Cook), businesswoman murdered by love rival in January 2016
 Elizabeth Rider, actress (1969–76)

References

External links
 The Newark Academy official website
 Sconce Hills Secondary School

Academies in Nottinghamshire
Newark-on-Trent
Secondary schools in Nottinghamshire